The Bega Veche (also: Beregsău,  – Stari Begej) is a left tributary of the river Bega in Romania and Serbia. It discharges into the canalized part of the Bega near Zrenjanin. The lower part of the river is the old course of the Bega. It drains the area north of the city of Timișoara. It flows through the villages Comeat, Bogda, Charlotenburg, Remetea Mică, Fibiș, Pișchia, Cerneteaz, Covaci, Sânandrei, Săcălaz, Beregsău Mare, Beregsău Mic, Bobda and Cenei in Romania, and through Hetin and Banatski Dvor in Serbia. Many rivers of the Banat plain have been channelized. The channelization started in the 18th century and has continued in the following centuries. At present most of these rivers have been integrated into the system of drainage channels of the area. This development has significantly modified the original natural river network.

Tributaries 

The following rivers are tributaries to the river Bega Veche (in downstream order):

Left: Buzad, Hamoș, Honoș, Șumanda, Băcin, Valea Dosului
Right: Sintar, Măgheruș, Pârâul Lacului, Apa Mare

References

Rivers of Romania
Rivers of Serbia
Rivers of Timiș County